Sir Gordon Richard Conway  (born 6 July 1938) is an agricultural ecologist and former President of the Rockefeller Foundation and the Royal Geographical Society. He is currently Professor of International Development at Imperial College, London and Director of Agriculture for Impact, a grant funded by the Bill & Melinda Gates Foundation, which focuses on European support of agricultural development in Africa.

Education
Conway was educated at the Bangor University, Cambridge University and the University of the West Indies in Trinidad. He completed his Doctor of Philosophy degree at the University of California, Davis.

Career
In the early 1960s, working in Sabah, North Borneo, he became one of the pioneers of sustainable agriculture and integrated pest management. From 1970 to 1986, he was Professor of Environmental Technology at the Imperial College of Science and Technology in London. He then directed the sustainable agriculture program of the International Institute for Environment and Development in London before becoming Representative of the Ford Foundation in New Delhi from 1988 to 1992. He was Vice-Chancellor of the University of Sussex and Chair of the Institute of Development Studies.

He was elected the eleventh President of The Rockefeller Foundation in April 1998, a position he held until 2004. From 2004 to 2009 he was also President of the Royal Geographical Society. He took up his appointment as the UK Department for International Development's Chief Scientific Adviser in January 2005, serving until 2009.

Conway now works at Imperial College London and headed the Bill & Melinda Gates-funded project Agriculture for Impact looking into ways to increase and enhance agricultural development for smallholder farmers in Sub-Saharan Africa. It was an independent advocacy initiative, and was based at Imperial College London and was supported through the Agriculture for Impact Bill & Melinda Gates Foundation. According to the organization's website, the initiative ran until the summer of 2016. Agriculture for Impact also convened the Montpellier Panel, a group of international experts from the fields of agriculture, trade, policy, ecology and global development. He is a Deputy Lieutenant for East Sussex.

Honours and awards
June 2004 awarded an honorary degree from the Open University as Doctor of the University.
2004: elected a Fellow of the Royal Society
2005: invested Knight Commander of the Order of Saint Michael and Saint George (KCMG)
2005: listed on The 2005 Global Intellectuals Poll
2008: elected an Honorary Fellow of the Royal Academy of Engineering
2017: awarded the Founder's Medal of the Royal Geographical Society

Books
He has authored:

 Unwelcome Harvest: agriculture and pollution (Earthscan, Island Press)  
 The Doubly Green Revolution: Food for all in the 21st century (Penguin and University Press, Cornell) 
 Islamophobia: a challenge for us all (The Runnymede Trust) .

He co-authored:

 Science and Innovation for Development (UK Collaborative on Development Sciences (UKCDS))
 ''One Billion Hungry: Can we Feed the World?' was published in October 2012.

References

External links
Prof Sir Gordon Conway, KCMG, DL, FRS at Debrett's People of Today
 
 

1938 births
Living people
Alumni of Bangor University
Alumni of the University of Cambridge
University of California, Davis alumni
English ecologists
British agriculturalists
Knights Commander of the Order of St Michael and St George
Fellows of the Royal Society
People associated with the University of Sussex
Fellows of the Royal Geographical Society
Presidents of the Royal Geographical Society
Deputy Lieutenants of East Sussex
Presidents of the Rockefeller Foundation
Recipients of the Royal Geographical Society Founder's Medal